The Trevor Jones Memorial Trophy is a single match football competition held every pre-season at Kingsmeadow in memory of Trevor Jones, previously Kingstonian's Reserve Team Manager, who died from electrocution at the age of 34.

It was originally contested between Kingstonian and AFC Wimbledon; but after the 2009 edition AFC Wimbledon pulled out and The K's have played Woking and a Fulham XI. The first installment of this competition in July 2003 was known as the Kingsmeadow Cup, but the name was changed after Trevor Jones' death.

Past winners

References

External links
 AFC Wimbledon Official Website
 Kingstonian FC Official Website
 Woking FC Official Website

Football in Surrey